The Venerable  Christopher John Hawthorn  (born 29 April 1936) was Archdeacon of Cleveland from 1991 to 2001.

Hawthorn was educated at Marlborough College; Queens' College, Cambridge and Ripon College Cuddesdon. He was ordained Deacon in 1962, and Priest. After a curacy at Sutton-on-Hull he held incumbencies at St Nicholas, Hull (1966–1972); Christ Church, Coatham (1972–1979); and St Martin's-on-the-Hill, Scarborough (1979–1991). He was Rural Dean of Scarborough from 1982 to 1991; and a Canon of York from 1987 to 2001

References

1936 births
People educated at Marlborough College
Alumni of Queens' College, Cambridge
Alumni of Ripon College Cuddesdon
Archdeacons of Cleveland
Living people